Safiar Khan (also Romanized as Şafīār Khān and Şafīyār Khān) is a village in Safa Khaneh Rural District, in the Central District of Shahin Dezh County, West Azerbaijan Province, Iran. At the 2006 census, its population was 176, in 31 families.

References 

Populated places in Shahin Dezh County